Ammar Aziz is a Pakistani documentary filmmaker and poet. He's a recipient of the International Federation of Film Critics Award. His debut feature length film A Walnut Tree had its world premiere at IDFA and North American premiere at Hot Docs. The film won awards for the best film from Film SouthAsia, Moscow International Documentary Film Festival, Sole Luna Doc-Film Festival  and others. His Second feature film, Discount Workers, had world premiere at One World Film Festival and opened a film festival in Kolkata 

He's a former left-wing activist. In 2014, he started an online petition against Lawrence & Wishart for claiming the copyright to Marx/Engels Collected Works.

As a filmmaker, he was initially known for his work about the working class of Pakistan. A graduate of Lahore's National College of Arts, he was the only  filmmaker from Pakistan to be selected in 2012 for the Talent Campus of the Berlin International Film Festival. In 2022, he won the Berlinale Mastercard Enablement program  for his organisation SAMAAJ's work on Super Sohni, an animated short series on child sexual abuse prevention in Pakistan.

References 

Pakistani documentary filmmakers
Pakistani filmmakers
Living people
People from Lahore
Pakistani Marxists
English-language poets from Pakistan
National College of Arts alumni
Year of birth missing (living people)